The Waldstadion (Forest Stadium), currently known as the Deutsche Bank Park for sponsorship purposes, and formerly known as the Commerzbank-Arena, is a retractable roof sports stadium in Frankfurt, Hesse, Germany. The home stadium of the football club Eintracht Frankfurt, it was opened in 1925. The stadium has been upgraded several times since then; the most recent remodelling was its redevelopment as a football-only stadium in preparation for the 2005 FIFA Confederations Cup and 2006 FIFA World Cup. With a capacity of 51,500 spectators for league matches and 48,500 for American football and international matches, it is among the ten largest football stadiums in Germany. The stadium was one of the nine venues of 2011 FIFA Women's World Cup, and hosted four matches including the final.

The sports complex, which is owned by the city of Frankfurt, includes the actual stadium and other sports facilities, including a swimming pool, a tennis complex, a beach volleyball court and a winter sports hall. The arena has its own railway station, Frankfurt Stadion, on the national rail network.

History

First stadium 
The original stadium was opened on 21 May 1925, after four years of construction, its total cost having been 3.7 million marks (equivalent to €14 million today). The site of a former military shooting range was chosen as the location of the sports park, which also included a fairground and integrated cycling and swimming stadium was designed. The stadium had a capacity of 35,000 spectators. The grandstands consisted mainly of earthworks, including the former bullet trap for the south grandstand. Only the grandstand on the north side was made of reinforced concrete and had a facade modeled on an ancient Greek theater.

The Waldstadion's first major national event was the final of the German football championship on June 7, 1925. 1. FC Nürnberg defeated local club FSV Frankfurt 1:0. Between 24 and 28 July 1925, the Waldstadion hosted the 1925 Workers' Summer Olympiad. The football final between Germany and Finland was played in front of a crowd of 40,000 spectators. In 1937, the spectator capacity through expansion of the back straight was increased to 55,000.

The first modification and the introduction of the Bundesliga
The first major changes to the stadium were made following a game between Eintracht Frankfurt and 1. FC Nürnberg in May 1953. Almost 70,000 tickets were sold for a stadium envisioned for only 55,000 spectators, and 200 fans were injured as thousands tried to force entry.

The renovated and enlarged Waldstadion was reopened on 14 May 1955 after 19 months of construction work. The stadium once more hosted national team matches as well as some important games for Eintracht Frankfurt, who reached the final round of the German National Championships in 1959. During the run to the final, 81,000 watched Eintracht beat FK Pirmasens - an attendance record that still stands.

In December 1960, an ice rink was opened within the oval of the velodrome. Here, the ice hockey team of Eintracht Frankfurt played their home games until 1981. In 1960 the stadium was given floodlights.

The first Bundesliga game in the Waldstadion took place on 24 August 1963 – a 1–1 draw with 1. FC Kaiserslautern on the first day of the new German national league.

The stadium hosted the World Championships in track cycling in 1966 and the heavyweight boxing championship between Muhammad Ali and Karl Mildenberger on 10 September 1966, won by Ali with a knockout in the 12th round in front of 22,000 spectators.

Second reconstruction 
The second major renovation of the Waldstadion was needed for the 1974 FIFA World Cup. From May 1972 to January 1974, the stadium was rebuilt virtually from scratch to meet the comfort and safety requirements of the World Cup venues. The opening ceremony of the 1974 World Cup was held at the Waldstadion. 

In 1978, improved drainage and undersoil heating were installed.

The first final of the newly introduced Women's European Cup was held at the stadium in May 2002, and the home team of 1. FFC Frankfurt beat Swedish side Umeå IK 2–0 to lift the trophy.

Today's arena

Current usage 

The new Waldstadion is primarily designed as a football stadium, but can be used for other turf sports like American football and major events. The grandstand offers rooms that are for meetings, conventions and other events in external markets.

The new arena was officially opened at the 2005 FIFA Confederations Cup, the test run for the 2006 World Cup. Both the opening match (Germany 4–3 Australia) and the final (Brazil 4–1 Argentina) were hosted at the stadium.

Football 
The main user of the stadium is the football team Eintracht Frankfurt, which has used the stadium as its home base since 1963. 

In addition, the stadium also serves occasionally as an alternative venue for home games of other teams: 1. FSV Mainz 05 played their qualifying matches for the 2005-06 UEFA Cup against the Armenian representatives Mika and against Keflavík ÍF from Iceland and for the 1st Round proper against Sevilla FC in the Commerzbank Arena.

The women of the local football team 1. FFC Frankfurt defeated Umeå IK 3–2 in the stadium on 24 May 2008 in the final second leg of UEFA Women's Cup, winning the European Cup for the third time and setting up a record for women's club football of 27,500 spectators.

The Turkish Football Federation has also staged several games in the arena, as Turks form a significant ethnic minority in Germany. Beşiktaş won the Turkish Super Cup with a 1–0 win over Galatasaray. Due to the suspension by UEFA of the Turkish national stadium, the qualifying matches for UEFA Euro 2008 against Malta (final score 2–0 to Turkey), against Moldova (5–0 for the Turks) and against Norway (final score 2–2) were also played here.

American football 

The Waldstadion from 1991 to 2007, with a few interruptions, was home stadium for the NFL Europa's Frankfurt Galaxy American Football team. The stadium hosted the World Bowl '98, World Bowl 2000 and World Bowl XV in 2007. 

Since 2008 the ground has hosted the final of the German Bowl and the final match of the German Football League. An average of around 15,000 fans watched the 2008 and 2009 finals. 

The NFL has planned for two regular season games to be played in the stadium in 2023 and 2025, as part of the league's International Series.

Concerts 
The Waldstadion hosts numerous concerts and festivals every year, especially during the summer. Since 2013, the stadium hosts the BigCityBeats World Club Dome every end of May or June.

Naming rights 

As part of a naming sponsorship by Commerzbank AG, the Waldstadion was renamed the Commerzbank-Arena on 1 May 2005 for ten years. Commerzbank agreed to pay around €30 million to the city hosting company as part of the deal. During the 2005 FIFA Confederations Cup and the 2006 FIFA World Cup, the stadium was officially referred to as the FIFA World Cup Stadium Frankfurt, as FIFA rules do not permit commercial naming of stadia.

Commerzbank allowed the sponsorship contract to expire on June 30, 2020, after 15 years. The new name sponsor as of July 1, 2020 is Deutsche Bank, with whom a contract has been concluded until June 30, 2027, with an option to extend. Since July 1, 2020, the stadium is officially called Deutsche Bank Park.

International Football Tournaments

1974 FIFA World Cup

UEFA Euro 1988

2005 FIFA Confederations Cup

2006 FIFA World Cup

2011 FIFA Women's World Cup

See also 
List of football stadiums in Germany
Arena Națională
Stadion Narodowy

References

External links

  
 

1974 FIFA World Cup stadiums
2006 FIFA World Cup stadiums
2005 FIFA Confederations Cup stadiums
2011 FIFA Women's World Cup stadiums
UEFA Euro 1988 stadiums
UEFA Euro 2024 stadiums
Buildings and structures in Frankfurt
Eintracht Frankfurt
Retractable-roof stadiums in Europe
Football venues in Frankfurt
Defunct athletics (track and field) venues in Germany
Sports venues completed in 1925
Gerkan, Marg and Partners buildings
American football venues in Germany
1925 establishments in Germany
Music venues completed in 1925